Hasan Emir Gökalp (born 12 October 1995) is a Turkish professional basketball player who plays as a Point guard for Bahçeşehir Koleji of the Basketbol Süper Ligi (BSL) and Basketball Champions League.

References

External links
Emir Gökalp Euroleague.net Profile
Emir Gökalp TBLStat.net Profile
Emir Gökalp Eurobasket Profile
Emir Gökalp TBL Profile

1995 births
Living people
Bahçeşehir Koleji S.K. players
Bandırma B.İ.K. players
Fethiye Belediyespor players
Galatasaray S.K. (men's basketball) players
Point guards
Turkish men's basketball players
Yalovaspor BK players
21st-century Turkish people